The Maelstrom of Paris or The Whirlwind of Paris (French:Le tourbillon de Paris) is a 1928 French silent film directed by Julien Duvivier and starring Lil Dagover, Léon Bary and Gaston Jacquet.

Cast
 Lil Dagover as Lady Amiscia Abenston  
 Léon Bary as Jean Chaluste  
 Gaston Jacquet as Lord Abenston  
 Gina Barbieri as La mère  
 Hubert Daix as L'aubergiste  
 René Lefèvre as Faverger  
 Léonce Cargue as Le directeur 
 Raymond Narlay as L'auteur  
 Antoine Stacquet as Le régisseur 
 Jane Dolys as L'habilleuse 
 Jean Diéner 
 Louis Gauthier 
 Genevieve Irwin
 Philip Kieffer 
 Louis Merlac
 Jane Pierson 
 Marcelle Yrven

References

Bibliography 
 Goble, Alan. The Complete Index to Literary Sources in Film. Walter de Gruyter, 1999.

External links 
 

1928 films
French silent films
1920s French-language films
Films directed by Julien Duvivier
Films based on French novels
French black-and-white films
1920s French films